Borgarnes is a town located on a peninsula at the shore of Borgarfjörður in Iceland and is the largest town in the Borgarbyggð municipality with a population of about 3800 residents. It is a main junction in Iceland and the gateway to the Snaefellsnes National Park.  Iceland's capital Reykjavik is 69 kilometers from the center of Borgarnes.  The second largest bridge in Iceland, the Borgarfjarðarbrú, connects traffic to and from Reykjavik.

Local area 
There are four national forests in the region (approximately 40 km from the town center) which are overseen by the Icelandic Forest Service.  The forest in Borgarfjörður are mix of birch woods and native conifers. These forests are Vatnshorn , Norðtunga , Selskógar , Stalpastaðir  and Jafnaskarð . Borgarnes has the oldest and tallest of the birch trees in Iceland.

History 
Borgarnes was founded in the late nineteenth-century, in a region that served as the setting of Egil's Saga. The town draws its name from Borg á Mýrum, the farm of Egill Skallagrímsson, the saga's poet-hero protagonist. A museum in Borgarnes, the Settlement Center, is devoted to the region's ties to Egill Skallagrímsson.

Arts & Culture 
The Safnahús Borgarfjarðar is a civilization museum that displays cultural artifacts and historical photos. Safnahús Borgarfjarðar was one of Iceland's first collections to receive the formal recognition of the Saga Council in (2013).

Borgarnes is famous for its park Skallagrímsgarður . A small hill in the park is said to be the grave of a viking hero, Skallagrímur Kveldúlfsson.

Borgarnes is also one of the filming locations in the Hollywood film The Secret Life of Walter Mitty. The Geirabakari Kaffihus, which is featured in the film, was transformed into Papa John's during the filming.
Borgarnes is the birthplace of Icelandic composer Anna Thorvaldsdottir.

Borgarnes is the hometown of Magnús Scheving, an athlete and entrepreneur best known for creating, directing, and starring in children's television show LazyTown. He cites Borgarnes as a unique experience, having only 3 other students in his grade at school.

Economy 
Borgarnes' commerce is primarily based on agriculture, tourism and culture.

References

External link

Populated places in Western Region (Iceland)
Borgarbyggð